Konstantina (Κωνσταντίνα) is a female given name of Greek origin and may refer to:

Konstantina Benteli (born 1993), Greek weightlifter
Konstantina Katsaiti (born 1980), Greek footballer
Konstantina Kefala (born 1977), Greek long-distance runner
Konstantina Kouneva (born 1964), Bulgarian-Greek politician, MEP
Konstantina Koutra (born 1979), Greek alpine skier
Konstantina Lukes (contemporary), American politician
Konstantina Moutos (born 1964), New Zealand fashion designer
Konstantina Vlachaki (born 1995), Greek volleyball player

Greek feminine given names